Rybatskoye is a station on the Nevsko–Vasileostrovskaya Line of Saint Petersburg Metro, opened on 28 December 1984.

Design features 

Rybatskoye is one of the 5 stations of the St. Petersburg metro that are located at ground level, with the other four being Kupchino, Devyatkino, Parnas and Shushary. Like with the other four stations, behind Rybatskoye begins the depot of the same name, which serves lines 3, 4, and more recently, also line 5. Furthermore, it's also adjacent to the eponymous railway station on the Saint Petersburg–Moscow railway.

Saint Petersburg Metro stations
Railway stations in Russia opened in 1984